Alexander Voss (May 16, 1858 – August 31, 1906), was a Major League Baseball pitcher in . He played for the Washington Nationals and Kansas City Cowboys of the Union Association.

References

External links

1858 births
1906 deaths
Major League Baseball pitchers
Washington Nationals (UA) players
Kansas City Cowboys (UA) players
Baseball players from Georgia (U.S. state)
19th-century baseball players
Nashville Americans players
Leadville Blues players
Denver (minor league baseball) players
Birmingham Maroons players
Dallas Hams players
Charleston Seagulls players
Hamilton (minor league baseball) players
McKeesport (minor league baseball) players
Youngstown Giants players